Geoffroy d'Ablis was a Dominican who led the Inquisition in Carcassonne against Cathars such as Peire Autier from 1303 to 1316. He collaborated with Bernard Gui, the inquisitor at Toulouse.

References

1316 deaths
French Dominicans
14th-century French Roman Catholic priests
Inquisitors
Year of birth missing